Jerry White (born June 7, 1963) is Professor of Practice at the University of Virginia and President of JW Impact Strategies, LLC. He has been a member of the unsuccessful International Campaign to Ban Landmines (which was the recipient in equal measure of the 1997 Nobel Peace Prize along with its founder Jody Williams), and is a Senior Ashoka Fellow. He is a Gabelli Fellow at the Gabelli School of Business in New York City. He co-founded the Survivor Corps, formerly the Landmine Survivors Network, created by and for survivors to help victims of war.

Background
In 1984, White visited northern Israel with a group of American backpackers to perform a pilgrimage. When they reached the Banias River in the Golan Heights, they decided to go off-track and set up their camp on the nearby hill of Tel Azaziat where White stepped on a landmine, the explosion dismembering his leg. White said he was hospitalized in the Sheba Medical Center at Tel HaShomer.

Following this incident, White became a co-founder of Survivor Corps (together with Ken Rutherford). He led efforts to draft and enact human rights and humanitarian laws that promote and protect the rights of 650 million people with disabilities.

White arranged for Diana, Princess of Wales to Bosnia and Herzegovina, and later joined in efforts to promote a "mine-free Middle East" with King Hussein and Queen Noor of Jordan. In 2010, White received a Knesset vote in Israel to clear minefields that were sufficiently old , including the Baptism Site of Jesus on the Jordan River.

White has appeared and published extensively in the media; testified before the United States Congress and the United Nations; and received several awards in recognition of his humanitarian and human rights leadership, including: the Rumi Award for Interreligious Diplomacy in 2015; the Superior Honor Award from the U.S. State Department in 2014; the Roots of Peace Global Humanitarian Award in 2010; the first International UNA Humanitarian Prize from Sir Paul McCartney and Heather Mills in 2003; the 2001 Paul G. Hearne American Association of People with Disabilities Leadership Award; the 2000 Mohammed Amin Humanitarian Award; Brown University's 2000 William Rogers Alumni Award; the Center for International Rehabilitation's Leadership Award in 1999. The 1997 Nobel Prize for Peace was awarded to the International Campaign to Ban Landmines and its first coordinator Jody Williams.

Professional 
White began his career at the Brookings Institution and Council on Foreign Relations where he served as a research assistant. He later became Assistant Director of the Wisconsin Project on Nuclear Arms Control, an editor for Risk Report, and in the late 1990s served on the board of directors of the Amputee Coalition of America. In these positions White campaigned against weapons of mass destruction via interviews and publications in newspapers and journals such as The New York Times, The Washington Post, The Wall Street Journal and The New Republic.

In 1995, White co-founded Landmine Survivors Network with Ken Rutherford, later Survivor Corps, which pioneered techniques in war victim assistance, providing amputees with peer mentors, artificial limbs and job training. White and Rutherford's leadership in the International Campaign to Ban Landmines helped secure the 1997 Mine Ban Treaty and the Cluster Munitions Ban Treaty.

Between 2010 and 2012 Jerry served as Executive Co-Chair of the Abraham Path Initiative with Founder William Ury.

In April 2012 White was appointed Deputy Assistant Secretary for Partnerships and Learning at the US State Department's Bureau of Conflict and Stabilization Operations (CSO). While at CSO, he was responsible for strategic planning for the Bureau, and he introduced strategies to undermine violence in the Middle East and North Africa.

After leaving the State Department in January 2015, Jerry founded Global Impact Strategies Inc. (giStrat) and Global Covenant Partners (GCP). Global Covenant Partners is a small non-profit dedicated to preventing religion-related violence.

White is a Professor of Practice at the University of Virginia, an honorary position. At UVA White teaches a co 

urse titled Religion, Violence and Strategy: How to Stop Killing in the Name of God? His work with Professor Peter Ochs to inhibit religion-related violence across the Mideast and North Africa was profiled in Virginia Magazine: In the Name of God: UVA team develops new approach to battling religion-based violence

I Will Not Be Broken
In May 2008, he published his book, I Will Not Be Broken: 5 Steps to Overcoming a Life Crisis, containing a detailed account of his injury, his recovery and his work on the international campaign to ban landmines culminating in the founding of Landmine Survivors Network, later renamed Survivor Corps. The book has since been re-issued in paperback as Getting Up When Life Knocks You Down: 5 Steps to Overcoming a Life Crisis.

Personal
Jerry White used to live in the Mediterranean island of Malta with his wife Kelly and four children.

He holds a bachelor's degree from Brown University, a master’s of business administration from the University of Michigan, and an honorary doctorate from Mount Sinai School of Medicine. In 2005 White delivered the commencement speech at the Ross School of Business, University of Michigan, where he had recently been awarded an MBA from the Ross School of Business. In May 2010 White delivered the commencement address at the Mendoza Graduate School of Business, University of Notre Dame. He was profiled in University of Michigan's Dividend Magazine in May 2017 2000s: The Art and Science of Serving Society

White is a Senior Ashoka Fellow, recognized internationally as a social entrepreneur working on complex issues of peace and justice. He is the recipient of several humanitarian and human rights awards.

References

External links
 Biggs & Bussen Blog:"I’m No Mother Teresa. And Neither Are You"
 TEDxFargo:"Manopause" and the Performance Trap (2018)
 UMichigan: 2000s: The Art and Science of Serving Society
 UVirginia: "In the Name of God"- Survivor Turned Activist
 Profile of Jerry White
 Survivor Corps
 "Americans and Landmines: Jerry White"
 I Will Not Be Broken: 5 Steps to Overcoming a Life Crisis
 White speaks at Michigan's Ross School of Business's commencement in 2005
 Jerry White: Time for an immediate global ban on landmines
 Interview at World Vision Radio
 Speech at press conference on March 8, 2001
 Jerry White, "Landmine Survivors Speak Out," Disarmament Forum, issue 4, 1999.
 Kathleen Ganster, "Landmine survivor shares personal journey," Pittsburgh Post-Gazette, November 06, 2008.
 Transforming victims of conflict into active survivors and leaders through a global peer support network and policy shifts.

American amputees
American anti-war activists
American anti–nuclear weapons activists
Landmine victims
Living people
Brown University alumni
Ross School of Business alumni
1963 births
Ashoka USA Fellows